Harry Vaughn Cail (August 12, 1913 – April 4, 2008) was an American sport shooter. He competed in the 50 m rifle event at the 1948 Summer Olympics.

References

1913 births
2008 deaths
American male sport shooters
ISSF rifle shooters
Canadian emigrants to the United States
Sportspeople from New Brunswick
Olympic shooters of the United States
Shooters at the 1948 Summer Olympics
People from Palermo, Maine